Black Dutch is a term with several different meanings in United States dialect and slang. It generally refers to racial, ethnic or cultural roots. Its meaning varies and such differences are contingent upon time and place. Several varied groups of multiracial people have sometimes been referred to as or identified as Black Dutch, most often as a reference to their ancestors.

The term Black Dutch appears to have become widely adopted in the Southern Highlands and as far west as Texas in the early 1800s by certain Southeastern families of mixed race ancestry, especially those of Native American descent.  When used in the South, it usually did not imply African admixture, although some families who used the term were of tri-racial descent.

In addition, some mixed race persons of European and African descent identified as Portuguese or Native American, as a way to explain their variations in physical appearance from Europeans and to be more easily accepted by European-American neighbors.  By the late 18th century, numerous free mixed race families were migrating west, along with English neighbors, to the frontiers of Virginia and North Carolina, where racial castes were less strict than in plantation country of the Tidewater.

Germans
The term "Dutch" for people of German descent also acquired a wider meaning. In those days "Dietsch" or "Duitsch" and "Deutsch" were the words for the Germanic languages spoken in what we now know as the Netherlands and Germany. Germans with swarthy or darker complexions were called "Black Dutch" (or Schwarze Deutsche or "black german"). According to James Pylant, who studied families claiming "Black Dutch" as part of their heritage:

"There are strong indications that the original "Black Dutch" were swarthy-complexioned Germans. Anglo-Americans loosely applied the term to any dark-complexioned American of European descent. The term was adopted [by some people] as an attempt to disguise Indian or infrequently, tri-racial descent. By the mid-19th century, the term had become an American colloquialism; a derogative term for anything denoting one's small stature, dark coloring, working-class status, political sentiments or anyone of foreign extract. In contrast to the Anglo-surnamed Melungeons, nearly 60% of American families reporting Black Dutch tradition bear surnames that are either decidedly German or possibly Americanized from Germanic origin."

Even in the 1820s, ethnic German men who differed over politics used "Black Dutch" as a slur against opponents.

Melungeon
Late 20th-century research by Paul Heinegg found that 80 percent of people listed as free people of color in censuses from 1790–1810 in North Carolina, could be traced back to African Americans identified as free in Virginia in colonial times. Based on his research, he found that most such free African-American families before the American Revolution were descended from unions in the working class – between white women (whose status made their children free by the principle of partus sequitur ventrem) and African men: free, indentured servants and slaves.

Since the late 20th century, DNA tests of people from core Melungeon families, as documented in the Melungeon DNA Project coordinated by Jack Goins, have shown most individuals are of European and African descent, rather than having Native American ancestry. This is a confirmation of Heinegg's genealogical research, summarized in his Free African Americans in Virginia, North Carolina, South Carolina, Maryland and Delaware (1995–2005), which is available for free online.

Native Americans passing for white
As early as the 18th century, ethnic Germans and Irish/scots-irish migrated from Pennsylvania into Virginia through the Shenandoah Valley and settled in the backcountry of the Appalachian Mountains, areas considered the frontier compared to Tidewater Virginia and the Low Country of the coast. They likely continued to use their term of "Black Dutch" to refer to swarthy-skinned people or, more generally, political opponents. Historically, mixed-race European-Native American and sometimes full blood Native American families of the South adopted the term "Black Dutch" for their own use, and to a lesser extent, "Black Irish," first in Virginia, North Carolina, and Tennessee. As the researcher Paul Heinegg noted, the frontier was also the area of settlement of mixed-race families of African and European ancestry, who also used the terms.

They may have attempted to "pass" and avoid being removed to Indian Territory or stigmatized by what became a majority Anglo-American society.  Some Native Americans, mainly from the Five Civilized Tribes of the Southeast, claimed "Black Dutch" or "Black Irish" heritage in order to purchase land in areas which United States treaties and other laws had reserved for people of European descent. Once they owned the land, such families who had escaped forced removal would not admit to their Native American heritage, for fear of losing their property.

As an example, an exhibit at the state-run Oakville Indian Mounds Park and Museum in Lawrence County, Alabama gives the history of the term among Cherokee in the local area after Indian Removal:

Before the Indian Removal Act in 1830, many of Lawrence County's Cherokee people were already mixed with white settlers and stayed in the country of the Warrior Mountains. They denied their ancestry and basically lived much of their lives in fear of being sent West. Full bloods claimed to be Black Irish or Black Dutch, thus denying their rightful Native American blood. After being fully assimilated into the general population years later, these Irish Cherokee mixed-blood descendants, began reclaiming their Native American heritage in the land of the Warrior Mountains, Lawrence County, Alabama. During the 1900 U.S. Census only 78 people claimed their Native American heritage. In 1990, more than 2000 individuals claimed Native American descent. Today more than 4000 citizens are proud to claim their Native American heritage and are members of the Echota Cherokee tribe.

Black Dutch in the Midwest and Deep South
Over time, the term "Black Dutch" migrated with certain families of mixed ancestry from North Carolina, Kentucky, and Tennessee to Missouri and Arkansas, as well as to Mississippi, Alabama, Texas, and Oklahoma, where its original meaning became lost. Many people born in the 20th century have claimed Black Dutch heritage, sometimes in addition to Native heritage, without having any idea who their "Black Dutch" ancestors were supposed to be. Unlike families in Pennsylvania or Virginia, most of the mixed-race "Black Dutch" families of the Deep South have English , Scots or Irish  surnames, and have no German ancestry in their families.

See also
Melungeon
Black Irish
Ramapo Mountain People
Jersey Dutch

References

External links
Myra Vanderpool Gormley, C.G., "In Search of the Black Dutch", Shaking the Family Tree, 2 April 1998, Ancestry.com
"Gypsies" in the United States", Migrations, Smithsonian Institution

Multiracial ethnic groups in the United States
African–Native American relations
Anti-German sentiment in the United States
Class discrimination
Xenophobia in North America